Josh Quayhagen (born August 30, 1986) is an American mixed martial artist currently competing in the Lightweight division. A professional mixed martial artist since 2011, Quayhagen has previously fought for Legacy FC, Bellator, and was a contestant on their reality show, Fight Master: Bellator MMA.

Background
Born and raised in Louisiana, Quayhagen began training in martial arts from a young age. 

A decorated karate competitor, he has won eight USKA World Champion Adult Black Belt Kumite Grand Championships and five National Grand Championships as well as a PKC National Black Belt Grand Kumite Championship. Quayhagen holds the record in all three of these events for being the youngest ever to win the Grand Champion in both events. Quayhagen was 18 years old at both USKA worlds and PKC Nationals and 19 years old as the winner of the USKA World Grand Kumite Champion. 

Quayhagen currently competes in full contact Karate League, Karate Combat. He is the reigning Welterweight Champion.

Mixed martial arts career

Bellator
Quayhagen made his professional and Bellator debut against Cosmo Alexandre at Bellator 52. Despite coming in as an underdog, Quayhagen won the fight via unanimous decision.

Quayhagen was scheduled to face Quaint Kempf at Bellator 61 on March 16, 2012. However, Kempf pulled out of the fight due to injury. Quayhagen instead faced Brenton Taylor in a rematch from a bout in November 2011. Quayhagen defeated Taylor via unanimous decision.

Quayhagen faced Cliff Wright at Bellator 69 on May 18, 2012. Quayhagen won the fight via unanimous decision.

Quayhagen was scheduled to face Guillaume DeLorenzi at Bellator 76 on October 12, 2012. However, the bout was rescheduled for November 2, 2012 at Bellator 79. The bout never materialized due to issues with Quayhagen's contract.

A rematch with Cosmo Alexandre took place on November 9, 2012 at Bellator 80. Quayhagen suffered his first professional defeat via unanimous decision.

Fight Master: Bellator MMA
Quayhagen appeared as one of the contestants on the first season of Fight Master: Bellator MMA that debuted on Spike TV in June 2013. Quayhagen faced fellow Bellator veteran Chris Lozano in the entry round. After two rounds of fighting, Quayhagen lost the fight via unanimous decision, thus ending his run in the competition.

Championships and accomplishments 
Karate Combat
Karate Combat 75kg Welterweight Championship (Current, one defense)

Mixed martial arts record

|-
|Win
|align=center| 9–5
|Rey Trujillo
|Decision (unanimous)
|Legacy Fighting Championship 58
| 
|align=center|3
|align=center|5:00
|Lake Charles, Louisiana, United States
|
|-
| Loss
|align=center| 8–5
|Zach Fears
|Decision (split)
|WFC 52: Allen vs. Rader
|
|align=center|3
|align=center|5:00
|Baton Rouge, Louisiana, United States
|
|-
| Loss
|align=center| 8–4
|Sean Soriano
| KO (punch)
|Legacy FC 48: Leite vs. Spann
|
|align=center|1
|align=center|3:21
|Lake Charles, Louisiana, United States
|
|-
|Win
|align=center|8–3
|Anthony Njokuani
|Decision (split)
|Legacy Fighting Championship 42
|
|align=center|3
|align=center|5:00
|Lake Charles, Louisiana, United States
|
|-
|Loss
|align=center|7–3
|Thanh Le 
|TKO (punches)
|World Fighting Championships 31
|
|align=center|1
|align=center|2:49
|Baton Rouge, Louisiana, United States
|
|-
|Loss
|align=center|7–2
|Lanny Dardar
|Technical Submission
|Vengeance Fighting Alliance: Round 3
|
|align=center|3
|align=center|4:18
|Lake Charles, Louisiana, United States
|
|-
|Win
|align=center|7–1
|Thomas Webb
|Decision (unanimous)
|WFC 12: Battle at the Belle
|
|align=center|3
|align=center|5:00
|Baton Rouge, Louisiana, United States
|
|-
|Loss
|align=center|6–1
|Cosmo Alexandre
|Decision (unanimous)
|Bellator 80
|
|align=center|3
|align=center|5:00
|Hollywood, Florida, United States
|
|-
|Win
|align=center|6–0
|Keith Miner
|KO (punches)
|USA MMA: Border War 3
|
|align=center|1
|align=center|3:31
|Lake Charles, Louisiana, United States
|
|-
|Win
|align=center|5–0
|Jason Haak
|KO (head kick)
|IXFA 8: Delta Downs
|
|align=center|1
|align=center|1:22
|Vinton, Louisiana, United States
|
|-
|Win
|align=center|4–0
|Cliff Wright
|Decision (unanimous)
|Bellator 69
|
|align=center|3
|align=center|5:00
|Lake Charles, Louisiana, United States
|
|-
|Win
|align=center|3–0
|Brenton Taylor
|Decision (unanimous)
|Bellator 61
|
|align=center|3
|align=center|5:00
|Bossier City, Louisiana, United States
|
|-
|Win
|align=center|2–0
|Brenton Taylor
|TKO (punches)
|Pain on the Cane 3
|
|align=center|1
|align=center|4:40
|Natchitoches, Louisiana, United States
|
|-
|Win
|align=center|1–0
|Cosmo Alexandre
|Decision (unanimous)
|Bellator 52
|
|align=center|3
|align=center|5:00
|Lake Charles, Louisiana, United States
|

Karate Combat record

References

Living people
1986 births
American male mixed martial artists
Lightweight mixed martial artists
American male karateka
Mixed martial artists from Louisiana
Mixed martial artists utilizing karate
People from Vernon Parish, Louisiana